Helan Abdulla (Kurdish: هێلین عەبدوڵڵا; born 16 November 1988), better known by her stage name Helly Luv (ھێڵی لۆڤ), is a Kurdish-Finnish singer, dancer, choreographer, actress and model. She rose to fame after uploading cover videos on social media websites like Myspace and YouTube. Helly Luv has since starred in movies, music videos and has released her own material. Gaining popularity from her 2013 single "Risk It All", Helly Luv has recently signed to G2 Music Group. In 2014, she appeared in her first theatrical feature film, Mardan.

Personal life 
Helly Luv was born to a  Kurdish family during the Persian Gulf War in the city of Urmia, Iran on November 16, 1988. Her family escaped the city of Dohuk in Iraqi Kurdistan by fleeing to Iran, where she was born, and suddenly to Turkey for safety. Eventually Helly Luv and her family's application was approved to become citizens of Finland, allowing her and her family to be one of the first Kurdish immigrants to live there. She took an interest in singing in a neighborhood choir and then expanded her interest by playing the piano, and taking drama classes. She began performing in school demonstrating her singing and dancing abilities. Dancing became her primary focus and afforded her an opportunity to compete in European dance championships and soon signed a contract with Finland's Nike Women.

Career 
In 2006, Helly Luv moved to Los Angeles, California, United States on her own to pursue her dream. Just before she started making arrangements to return to Finland, Helly Luv received a Myspace message from Grammy winning record producer Los Da Mystro to sign an artist deal with his production company. During this deal she had the opportunity to work with Grammy award-winning singer-songwriter The-Dream. In winter 2013, Helly Luv signed a music deal with Gawain "G2" Bracy II and G2 Music Group. G2 Music Group released "Risk It All," the lively and inspirational leadoff single from Helly Luv's debut album. Produced almost entirely by Gawain "G2" Bracy II, the song synthesized Latin and Middle Eastern rhythms with world-pop songwriting. "Risk It All" received attention almost immediately in Finland, peaking all the way to the top three iTunes singles the first week and competing with Rihanna's "Diamonds" single.

In 2014, Helly Luv starred in the international film Mardan directed by Batin Ghobadi and Bahman Ghobadi where she played the leading role of Leila. Later that year she attended the Toronto International Film Festival becoming the first Kurdish actress to attend the event.

In 2015, Helly Luv shot the video for her single "Revolution" in an abandoned village near Mosul, where the Kurdish forces were fighting the ISIL. In the video of the single, she is seen painting the word "Revolution" on a tank shell in red lipstick and then Attack on the ISIL front lines just a few kilometers away.

Other ventures

Philanthropy 

In 2014, she created her Luv House non-profit organization to help the people and animals in need throughout Kurdistan. On January 22, 2014 Helly Luv, A.R.K (Animal Rights Kurdistan), W.I.N.E (Women's International Network Erbil), Dr. Sulaiman Tameer, KOARP (Kurdistan Organization for Animal Rights Protection), Miss Kurdistan Fenik, and the owner of the Zoo helped close the doors to the Gelkand Park in Kurdistan (the second worst zoo in the world). Helly Luv and the other organizations moved the animals to a new and improved zoo in Erbil, the capital of the Kurdistan region.

On July 6, 2014, Helly Luv visited the peshmerga headquarters in the city of Duhok, Iraq near the border of Mosul, Iraq during the defense against ISIL; with a mission to deliver food and water to the peshmerga troops.

Singles 
 "Risk It All" (2013)
 "Revolution" (2015)
"Bad Kitty (Down on the Floor)" (2012)
"GUNS & ROSES" (2018) with Ardian Bujupi 
”Boy-bye” (2019)
"Min Tu Navey" (2020)
"Mshtaglk" (2021) as featured artist
”Kurdish Barbie” (2022)

Filmography 
 Mardan (2014)
 Flag Without A Country (2015)

References

External links 

 
 

1988 births
English-language singers from Finland
21st-century Finnish women singers
Finnish people of Kurdish descent
Iranian emigrants to Finland
Iranian expatriates in the United States
Iranian expatriates in Turkey
Iranian Kurdish women
Iranian refugees
Kurdish women singers
Kurdish singer-songwriters
Kurdish-language singers
Finnish-language singers
Living people
People from Urmia
Finnish expatriates in the United States
21st-century American women singers
21st-century American singers
Refugees in Finland
Arabic-language singers